La Grenouille or GRENOUILLE may refer to:

 Grenouille, a main character in the novel "Perfume"
 La Grenouille (restaurant), in New York City, US
 René Benoit "La Grenouille", a fictional television character in the NCIS series
 GRENOUILLE, grating-eliminated no-nonsense observation of ultrafast incident laser light e-fields

See also
 Tadpole and the Whale (La Grenouille et la baleine), a film
 La Grenouillere (Monet) or Bain à la Grenouillère, a painting
 Frog (French: grenouille)